Rock Island Township is located in Rock Island County, Illinois. As of the 2010 census, its population was 17,776 and it contained 7,271 housing units.

Geography

Demographics

References

External links
City-data.com
Illinois State Archives

Townships in Rock Island County, Illinois
Townships in Illinois